WCVF-FM is an FM radio station in Fredonia, New York. Licensed to the State University of New York at Fredonia, the station broadcasts on 88.9 MHz on the FM dial. "CVF" stands for "Campus and Community Voice of Fredonia," the station's slogan. The station primarily features "alternative" rock, but includes an eclectic mix of genres at consistent times throughout the week. Listeners can catch blocks of Polka, Spanish, Blues, Jazz, Folk, Reggae, Hip Hop and anything in between. Live programs hosted by student and community jocks can be of any format/genre from talk, music, to radio drama. WCVF also covers local sports and includes live broadcasts/commentary for several Blue Devil teams. Our music director reports to College Music Journal for charting, and devotes time slots for new music sent to the station.

WCVF broadcasts National Public Radio (NPR) Monday through Friday: Morning Edition and All Things Considered. These broadcasts are graciously achieved through a partnership with NPR member station WQLN-FM in Erie, Pennsylvania.

WCVF-FM has a sister station WDVL which broadcasts via internet streaming and a local cable channel.

History
WCVF began as a production of the Speech English Department providing radio programming to students in the dorms via low powered AM transmitters in the dorm basements, at 600 kHz. Later the early AM station operation split away from the academic supervision to be operated and funded by the Student Government Association. Now independent and student run, the station operated for a time from the tiny press box in Dodds Hall. 
WCVF-FM was founded in 1978 under the supervision of Dan Berggren, a professor in the Department of Communications/Media. WCVF-FM is Chautauqua County's only public radio station, and is entirely student-run. In 1969 WCVF relocated to a suite of rooms in the basement of Jewett Hall in an air conditioned space originally designed as TV studios. In the summer of 1972 the station moved once again into new student-constructed offices and studios in Gregory Hall. As the college later constructed additional dormitories, WCVF added transmitters connecting them to the dorm power wiring in what was known as a "carrier-current" transmission. This expansion included installation of a transmitter to serve off-campus student housing in Brigham Road.

See also
List of radio stations in New York
State University of New York at Fredonia

References

External links
WCVF Official Website

CVF-FM
NPR member stations
CVF-FM
State University of New York at Fredonia
Radio stations established in 1978
1978 establishments in New York (state)